Edward Alexander Impey,  (born 28 May 1962) is a British historian, archaeologist, and museum curator. Between October 2013 and January 2022 he was Master of the Armouries and Director General of the Royal Armouries.

Early life and education
Impey was born on 28 May 1962 to Oliver Impey and Jane Mellanby. His father was a zoologist by training who became specialist in Japanese art, and his mother was a neuroscientist. His grandfather Kenneth Mellanby was a biochemist. He grew up in the City of Oxford where his father was a curator at the Ashmolean Museum. He was educated at the Dragon School, a preparatory school in Oxford, and at Bedales School, a private school near Petersfield, Hampshire.

Impey has degrees in history and archaeology. He studied at Oriel College, Oxford, graduated with a Bachelor of Arts (BA) degree and a Master of Philosophy (MPhil) degree. At Oxford, the BA is promoted to a Master of Arts (MA Oxon) degree a number of years after graduating, and an MPhil is a two-year taught master's degree. He remained at the University of Oxford to undertake postgraduate research, and completed his Doctor of Philosophy (DPhil) degree in 1991. His doctoral thesis was titled The origins and development of non-conventual monastic dependencies in England and Normandy 1000–1350.

Career
Impey worked as a curator at Historic Royal Palaces and served as Director of Heritage Protection and Planning at English Heritage. On 30 July 2013, he was announced as the next Master of the Armouries and Director General of the Royal Armouries. In 2022, however, he retired from this job and from work. He took up the appointments in October 2013 in succession to Lieutenant-General Jonathon Riley. Along with John Goodall, Impey is a patron of the Castle Studies Trust, a UK registered charity.

Personal life
In 2008, Impey married Karen Lundgren. Together, they have two daughters.

Honours
On 2 May 1996, Impey was elected a Fellow of the Society of Antiquaries of London (FSA). In 2011, he was elected a Fellow of the Royal Historical Society (FRHistS).

References

External links

 

 
 

1962 births
Living people
British historians
British archaeologists
British curators
Directors of museums in the United Kingdom
Fellows of the Society of Antiquaries of London
Fellows of the Royal Historical Society
People educated at The Dragon School
People educated at Bedales School
Alumni of Oriel College, Oxford
Place of birth missing (living people)
People from Oxford
Castellologists